Gibbons High School may refer to:

 Cardinal Gibbons High School (disambiguation), several schools with the same name
 Gibbons High School, in Petersburg, Virginia, merged into St. Vincent de Paul High School (Petersburg, Virginia)
 Notre Dame-Bishop Gibbons High School, Schenectady, New York